Palaemon intermedius is a species of shrimp of the family Palaemonidae. It is endemic to temperate waters around southeastern Australia. The shrimp is translucent, with red spots and narrow stripes.

References

Crustaceans described in 1860
Palaemonidae